Heart of Oak, of 300 tons (bm), was launched in South Carolina in 1762. She spent most of her career as a merchant vessel, though between 1777 and 1782 she served the Royal Navy as a hired armed ship. She was last listed in 1789.

Lloyd's List for 29 May 1764 reported that Heart of Oak, Gwinn, master, sailing from South Carolina to London, had arrived off Beachy.

Hired armed ship
Heart of Oak was commissioned in November 1777 under Commander Nathaniel Crosby, and served in the Liverpool area.

When the French attempted to invade Jersey in 1779, Admiral Mariot Arbuthnot, who had left Spithead with a squadron escorting a convoy en route to North America, sent the convoy in to Torbay and proceeded to the relief of Jersey with his ships. However, when he arrived he found that Captain Ford of  had the situation well in hand. The French flotilla retreated to Saint-Malo, but then anchored at Coutances. A British squadron under Captain Sir James Wallace in  attacked the French on 13 May 1779 at Cancale Bay. The British managed to set Valeur (6 guns), Écluse (8), and Guêpe (6) on fire, though the French were able to salvage Guêpe after the British withdrew. The British also captured Danaé (26 or 32 guns), a brig, and a sloop. Heart of Oak apparently was present in some capacity both at the relief and the subsequent action.

In October 1779, Captain Nathaniel Crosby underwent a court martial for embezzlement. He was found guilty, cashiered, and barred from any further employment in the Royal Navy. The purser, who testified against the captain, was discharged without court martial, but it was later established that he had not benefited from the fraud.

Heart of Oak shared with Eagle and Mary in the salvage money paid in January 1780 for the recapture of the brig Thames. The prize money notice, though, does not specify that Heart of Oak was the armed ship, and not the privateer by the same name.

From October 1779 to 1780 she served in the Bristol area under the command of W. Reman. He was still her commander into 1782. Lloyd's List for 14 December 1781 reported that  and Heart of Oak had sent the Three Sisters, Cornelieson, master, into Penzance. Three Sisters had been carrying a cargo of planks from Bruges to Nantes.

At the end of the American Revolutionary War the Royal Navy returned its hired armed vessels to their owners. Heart of Oak then resumed her mercantile career.

Lloyd's Register
The information in Lloyd's Register is only as accurate and up-to-date as the information owners of vessels bothered to provide. One finds, therefore, information that is stale-dated and inaccurate (i.e., contradicted in later listings). In the listing below, there is clearly a confusion of names between 1784 and 1787.

Citations and references
Citations

References
Clowes, W. Laird, et al. (1897–1903) The royal navy: a history from the earliest times to the present. (Boston: Little, Brown and Co.; London: S. Low, Marston and Co.).
Steel, P. (1805) A Treatise on Naval Courts Martial.
 

Age of Sail merchant ships
Merchant ships of the United Kingdom
Hired armed vessels of the Royal Navy
1762 ships